Eduard Liivak (5 August 1889 in Sõmeru Parish, Võru County – ?) was an Estonian politician. He was a member of I Riigikogu.

References

1889 births
Members of the Riigikogu, 1920–1923
Year of death missing